Nicolas Gargot de La Rochette was Governor of Plaisance (Placentia), Newfoundland in 1660. The post was left vacant until 1662.

See also 

 Governors of Newfoundland
 List of people of Newfoundland and Labrador

External links
Government House The Governorship of Newfoundland and Labrador
 

Gargot, Nicolas